Omashram is an old-age home located in Vijaya Bank Layout, Bilekahalli, Bangalore, India. The old-age home was founded by Mohan Pai in 2001, who worked as an adviser for various government projects. After his retirement he decided to establish this home.

References 

Old age in India